Ahnahaird is a small settlement on Achnahaird Bay in Ross and Cromarty, in the Scottish council area of Highland.

The beach at Achnahaird Bay was used in the filming of 'The Eagle' (directed by Kevin Macdonald).

External links

 Panorama of Achnahaird Bay (QuickTime required)

Populated places in Ross and Cromarty